Mijannah is a village in Jizan Province, in southwestern Saudi Arabia. The Invasion of Badr took place here.

See also

 List of cities and towns in Saudi Arabia
 Regions of Saudi Arabia

List of battles of Muhammad

References

Populated places in Jizan Province